My Buddy is a 1944 American crime film directed by Steve Sekely and written by Arnold Manoff. The film stars Don "Red" Barry, Ruth Terry, Lynne Roberts, Alexander Granach, Emma Dunn and John Litel. The film was released on October 12, 1944, by Republic Pictures.

Plot

Cast  
Don "Red" Barry as Eddie Ballinger 
Ruth Terry as Lola
Lynne Roberts as Lucy Manners
Alexander Granach as Tim Oberta
Emma Dunn as Mary Ballinger
John Litel as Father Jim Donnelly
George E. Stone as Pete
Jonathan Hale as Senator Henry
Ray Walker as Russ
Joe Devlin as Nicky Piastro
Matt McHugh as Happy

References

External links 
 

1944 films
1940s English-language films
American crime films
1944 crime films
Republic Pictures films
Films directed by Steve Sekely
American black-and-white films
1940s American films